Gerrit Willem van Oosten de Bruyn (17 October 1727 in Amersfoort – 16 July 1797 in Amersfoort), was an 18th-century lawyer from the Northern Netherlands.

Biography
After he studied law in Utrecht he moved to Haarlem, where he joined several societies and consorted with Pieter Teyler van der Hulst, who appointed him in his testament as member of Teylers Tweede Genootschap. He was an Orangist and during the Orangist uprising he became mayor of Haarlem in 1789 and 1790, but was ousted from the council in 1795 during the French occupation. He published an update of Samuel Ampzing's History of Haarlem and was a regent of the Hofje van Noblet. He had a summer house in Amersfoort called Randenbroek, which is where he died.

References

Author page in the DBNL
 Books by Gerrit Willem van Oosten de Bruyn on the Google Books Library Project

1727 births
1797 deaths
Dutch writers
Members of Teylers Tweede Genootschap
People from Amersfoort
People from Haarlem